Joe Fortunato (born April 7, 1994) is an American football long snapper for the Arizona Cardinals of the National Football League (NFL). He played college football at Delaware and has spent time with the Indianapolis Colts, Dallas Cowboys, Green Bay Packers, and Denver Broncos.

Early life and education
Fortunato was born on April 7, 1994, in Linwood, New Jersey. He attended Mainland Regional High School, competing in football, baseball, and basketball. On the football team, he played quarterback, tight end, and long snapper, helping them win the state championship in 2008. In baseball, he was a first baseman and pitcher, and led his school to a 13–5 mark as a senior. He was a forward in basketball and helped them achieve a 19–4 record in his only year with the team. He was a National Honor Society Student.

Fortunato enrolled at the University of Delaware. As a true freshman in 2012, he earned the long snapper duties and appeared in all 11 games. He recorded two tackles on punts. As a sophomore, he again played in all 11 games. As a junior, Fortunato added long snapping duties for field goals, as he previously only was on punts. He made two tackles in the season. He appeared in every game as a senior.

Professional career
Fortunato went unselected in the 2016 NFL Draft. He received a tryout with the Philadelphia Eagles, but was not signed.

Indianapolis Colts
On March 23, 2017, he was signed by the Indianapolis Colts, but was waived on May 1. In , he received a tryout with the Atlanta Falcons, but was not signed.

Dallas Cowboys

Green Bay Packers
On March 24, 2021, he was signed by the Green Bay Packers, and was released during training camp on August 5, 2021.

Denver Broncos
On October 12, 2022, Fortunato was signed to the Denver Broncos' practice squad, but was released three days later.

Arizona Cardinals
Fortunato signed a reserve/future contract with the Arizona Cardinals on January 11, 2023.

References

External links
Delaware Fightin' Blue Hens bio

1994 births
Living people
Players of American football from New Jersey
Delaware Fightin' Blue Hens football players
American football long snappers
Indianapolis Colts players
Dallas Cowboys players
Green Bay Packers players
Denver Broncos players
Arizona Cardinals players